During the 1981–82 English football season, Swansea City A.F.C. competed in the Football League First Division, following promotion from the Second Division. It was their debut season in the English top flight and the first season in which a Welsh club was part of the top English league since arch-rivals Cardiff City were relegated at the end of 1961–62.

Background
Swansea's rise to the top flight of English football had come only four seasons after competing in the Fourth Division and thus few tipped Swansea to survive in the First Division. Swansea soon proved the naysayers wrong by crushing Leeds United 5–1 in their first match ever in the top flight, with debutant Bob Latchford scoring a hat-trick. The win saw Swansea rise from the basement division to the top of the entire Football League in barely three years. Victories over footballing royalty such as Liverpool, Manchester United, Arsenal and Tottenham Hotspur followed as the club topped the league on several further occasions. However, injuries to key players took their toll, and the lack of depth in the squad meant that the season ended in sixth-place finish.

Transfers

In
  Dai Davies -  Wrexham, July
  Ray Kennedy -  Liverpool, January, £160,000
  Ian Walsh -  Crystal Palace, February
  Colin Irwin -  Liverpool, £338,800

Out
  Leighton Phillips -  Charlton Athletic, June, £25,000
  David Giles -  Leyton Orient, December, loan

Football League First Division

Results

Last updated: 4 September 2013Source:

Classification

Results summary

Results by round

FA Cup

Last updated: 4 September 2013Source:

Football League Cup

Last updated: 4 September 2013Source:

Welsh Cup

Last updated: 19 January 2014Sources:, Welsh Football Data Archive

European Cup Winners' Cup

Last updated: 4 September 2013Source:

Kit
Swansea's kit was manufactured by Belgian company Patrick. The kit bore no sponsorship.

Squad
Squad at end of season

Left club during season

Squad statistics
Last updated on 4 September 2013

Appearances and goals

Top scorers

See also
1981–82 in English football
List of Swansea City A.F.C. seasons

References
General

Bibliography

Specific

1981-82
English football clubs 1981–82 season
Welsh football clubs 1981–82 season